The 2012–13 season is Persipura's 5th Indonesia Super League (ISL) season in Indonesian football history. This is the third time they can get 1st in ISL League Table.

Squads

First team squads

Transfers

In

Competitions

Indonesia Super League

Matches

References

Persipura Jayapura seasons